Indian Americans are citizens of the United States with ancestry from India. The term Asian Indian is used to avoid confusion with Native Americans and the indigenous peoples of the Americas, who have historically been referred to as "Indians", also known as "American Indians". With a population of more than four and a half million, Indian Americans make up 1.35% of the U.S. population and they are also the largest group of South Asian Americans, as well as the second largest group of Asian Americans after Chinese Americans. Indian Americans are the highest-earning ethnic group in the United States.

Terminology
In the Americas, the term "Indian" had historically been used to describe indigenous people since European colonization in the 15th century. Qualifying terms such as "American Indian" and "East Indian" were and still are commonly used in order to avoid ambiguity. The U.S. government has since coined the term "Native American" in reference to the indigenous people of the United States, but terms such as "American Indian" remain among indigenous as well as non-indigenous populations. Since the 1980s, Indian Americans have been categorized as "Asian Indian" (within the broader subgroup of Asian American) by the United States Census Bureau.

While "East Indian" remains in use, the term "Indian" and "South Asian" is often chosen instead for academic and governmental purposes. Indian Americans are included in the census grouping of "South Asian Americans", which includes Bangladeshi Americans, Bhutanese Americans, Maldivian Americans, Nepalese Americans, Pakistani Americans, and Sri Lankan Americans.

History

Pre-1800
Beginning in the 17th century, members of the East India Company would bring Indian servants to the American colonies. There were also some East Indian slaves in the United States during the American colonial era. In particular, court records from the 1700s indicate a number of "East Indians" were held as slaves in Maryland and Delaware. Upon freedom, they are said to have blended into the free African-American population - considered "Mulattos".

19th century

In 1850, the federal census of St. Johns County, Florida, listed a 40-year-old draftsman named John Dick whose birthplace was listed as "Hindostan", living in city of St. Augustine. His race is listed as white, suggesting he was of British descent.

By 1900, there were more than two thousand Indian Sikhs living in the United States, primarily in California. (At least one scholar has set the level lower, finding a total of 716 Indian immigrants to the U.S. between 1820 and 1900.) Emigration from India was driven by difficulties facing Indian farmers, including the challenges posed by the colonial land tenure system for small landowners, and by drought and food shortages, which worsened in the 1890s.  At the same time, Canadian steamship companies, acting on behalf of Pacific coast employers, recruited Sikh farmers with economic opportunities in British Columbia.

The presence of Indians in the U.S. also helped develop interest in Eastern religions in the US and would result in its influence on American philosophies such as transcendentalism. Swami Vivekananda arriving in Chicago at the World's Fair led to the establishment of the Vedanta Society.

20th century
Escaping racist attacks in Canada, Sikhs migrated to Pacific Coast U.S. states in the 1900s to work on the lumber mills of Bellingham and Everett, Washington. Sikh workers were later concentrated on the railroads and began migrating to California; around 2,000 Indians were employed by the major rail lines such as Southern Pacific Railroad and Western Pacific Railroad between 1907 and 1908. Some white Americans, resentful of economic competition and the arrival of people from different cultures, responded to Sikh immigration with racism and violent attacks. The Bellingham riots in Bellingham, Washington on September 5, 1907, epitomized the low tolerance in the U.S. for Indians and Sikhs, who were called "Hindoos" by locals. While anti-Asian racism was embedded in U.S. politics and culture in the early 20th century, Indians were also racialized for their anticolonialism, with U.S. officials, who pushed for Western imperial expansion abroad, casting them as a "Hindu" menace. Although labeled Hindu, the majority of Indians were Sikh.

In the early 20th century, a range of state and federal laws restricted Indian immigration and the rights of Indian immigrants in the U.S. Throughout the 1910s, American nativist organizations campaigned to end immigration from India, culminating in the passage of the Barred Zone Act in 1917. In 1913, the Alien Land Act of California prevented non-citizens from owning land. However, Asian immigrants got around the system by having Anglo friends or their own U.S. born children legally own the land that they worked on.  In some states, anti-miscegenation laws made it illegal for Indian men to marry white women. However, it was legal for "brown" races to mix. Many Indian men, especially Punjabi men, married Hispanic women, and Punjabi-Mexican marriages became a norm in the West.

Bhicaji Balsara became the first known Indian to gain naturalized U.S. citizenship. As a Parsi, he was considered a "pure member of the Persian sect" and therefore a "free white person". In 1910, judge Emile Henry Lacombe of the Southern District of New York gave Balsara citizenship on the hope that the United States attorney would indeed challenge his decision and appeal it to create "an authoritative interpretation" of the law. The U.S. attorney adhered to Lacombe's wishes and took the matter to the Circuit Court of Appeals in 1910. The Circuit Court of Appeals agreed that Parsis are classified as white. On the same grounds, another federal court decision granted citizenship to A. K. Mozumdar. These decisions contrasted with the 1907 declaration by U.S. Attorney General Charles J. Bonaparte: "...under no construction of the law can natives of British India be regarded as white persons."
After the Immigration Act of 1917, Indian immigration into the U.S. decreased. Illegal entry through the Mexican border became the way of entering the country for Punjabi immigrants. California's Imperial Valley had a large population of Punjabis who assisted these immigrants and provided support. Immigrants were able to blend in with this relatively homogenous population. The Ghadar Party, a group in California that campaigned for Indian independence, facilitated illegal crossing of the Mexican border, using funds from this migration "as a means to bolster the party's finances". The Ghadar Party charged different prices for entering the US depending on whether Punjabi immigrants were willing to shave off their beard and cut their hair. It is estimated that between 1920 and 1935, about 1,800 to 2,000 Indian immigrants entered the U.S. illegally.

By 1920, the population of Americans of Indian descent was approximately 6,400. In 1923, the Supreme Court of the United States ruled in United States v. Bhagat Singh Thind that Indians were ineligible for citizenship because they were not "free white persons". The court also argued that the "great body of our people" would reject assimilation with Indians.<ref name="Thind">Zhao, X. & Park, E.J.W. (2013). Asian Americans: An Encyclopedia of Social, Cultural, Economic, and Political History</u>. Greenwood. pp. 1142. </ref> Furthermore, the court ruled that based on popular understanding of race, the term "white person" referred to people of northern or western European ancestry rather than "Caucasians" in the most technical sense. Over fifty Indians had their citizenship revoked after this decision, but Sakharam Ganesh Pandit fought against denaturalization. He was a lawyer and married to a white American, and he regained his citizenship in 1927. However, no other naturalization was permitted after the ruling, which led to about 3,000 Indians leaving the U.S. between 1920 and 1940. Many other Indians had no means of returning to India.

Indians started moving up the social ladder by getting higher education. For example, in 1910, Dhan Gopal Mukerji came to UC Berkeley when he was 20 years old. He was an author of many children's books and won the Newbery Medal in 1928 for his book Gay-Neck: The Story of a Pigeon. However, he committed suicide at the age of 46 while he was suffering from depression. Another student, Yellapragada Subbarow, came to the U.S. in 1922. He became a biochemist at Harvard University, and he "discovered the function of adenosine triphosphate (ATP) as an energy source in cells, and developed methotrexate for the treatment of cancer." However, being a foreigner, he was refused tenure at Harvard. Gobind Behari Lal, who came to the University of California, Berkeley in 1912, became the science editor of the San Francisco Examiner and was the first Indian American to win the Pulitzer Prize for journalism.

After World War II, U.S. policy re-opened the door to Indian immigration, although slowly at first. The Luce–Celler Act of 1946 permitted a quota of 100 Indians per year to immigrate to the U.S. It also allowed Indian immigrants to naturalize and become citizens of the U.S., effectively reversing the Supreme Court's 1923 ruling in United States v. Bhagat Singh Thind. The Naturalization Act of 1952, also known as the McCarran-Walter Act, repealed the Barred Zone Act of 1917, but limited immigration from the former Barred Zone to a total of 2,000 per year. In 1910, 95% of all Indian Americans lived on the western coast of the United States. In 1920, that proportion decreased to 75%; by 1940, it was 65%, as more Indian Americans moved to the East Coast. In that year, Indian Americans were registered residents in 43 states. The majority of Indian Americans on the west coast were in rural areas, but on the east coast they became residents of urban areas. In the 1940s, the prices of the land increased, and the Bracero program brought thousands of Mexican guest workers to work on farms, which helped shift second-generation Indian American farmers into "commercial, nonagricultural occupations, from running small shops and grocery stores, to operating taxi services and becoming engineers." In Stockton and Sacramento, a new group of Indian immigrants from the state of Gujarat opened several small hotels. In 1955, 14 of 21 hotels enterprises in San Francisco were operated by Gujarati Hindus. By the 1980s, Indians owned around 15,000 motels, about 28 percent of all hotels and motels in the U.S.

The Immigration and Nationality Act of 1965 dramatically opened entry to the U.S. to immigrants other than traditional Northern European groups, which would significantly alter the demographic mix in the U.S. Not all Indian Americans came directly from India; some came to the U.S. via Indian communities in other countries, including the United Kingdom, Canada, South Africa, the former British colonies of East Africa, (namely Kenya, Tanzania), and Uganda, Mauritius), the Asia-Pacific region (Malaysia, Singapore, Australia, and Fiji), and the Caribbean (Guyana, Trinidad and Tobago, Suriname, and Jamaica). From 1965 until the mid-1990s, long-term immigration from India averaged about 40,000 people per year.  From 1995 onward, the flow of Indian immigration increased significantly, reaching a high of about 90,000 immigrants in the year 2000.

21st century

The beginning of the 21st century marked a significant wave in the migration trend from India to the United States. The emergence of Information Technology industry in Indian cities as Bangalore, Chennai, and Hyderabad led to the large number of migrations to the US primarily from the states of Telangana, Andhra Pradesh, Karnataka, Kerala, and Tamil Nadu in South India. There are sizable populations of people from the states of Andhra Pradesh, Telangana, Gujarat, Karnataka, Kerala, and Tamil Nadu in the United States. Indians comprise over 80% of all H-1B visas. Indian Americans have risen to become the richest ethnicity in America, with an average household income of $126,891, almost twice the US average of $65,316.

Since 2000, a large number of students have started migrating to the United States to pursue higher education. A variety of estimates state that over 500,000 Indian American students attend higher-education institutions in any given year. As per Institute of International Education (IIE) 'Opendoors' report, 202,014 new students from India enrolled in US education institutions.

On January 20, 2021, Kamala Harris, an Indian American, made history as the first female Vice President of the United States. She was elected vice president as the running mate of President Joe Biden in the presidential election the previous November. This was a major milestone in Indian American history, and in addition to Harris, another 20 Indian Americans were nominated to key positions in the administration.

Demographics

According to the 2010 United States Census, the Asian Indian population in the United States grew from almost 1,678,765 in 2000 (0.6% of U.S. population) to 2,843,391 in 2010 (0.9%
of U.S. population), a growth rate of 69.37%, one of the fastest growing ethnic groups in the United States.

The New York-Newark-Bridgeport, NY-NJ-CT-PA Combined Statistical Area, consisting of New York City, Long Island, and adjacent areas within New York, as well as nearby areas within the states of New Jersey (extending to Trenton), Connecticut (extending to Bridgeport), and including Pike County, Pennsylvania, was home to an estimated 711,174 uniracial Indian Americans as of the 2017 American Community Survey by the U.S. Census Bureau, comprising by far the largest Indian American population of any metropolitan area in the U.S.;

New York City itself also contains by far the highest Indian American population of any individual city in North America, estimated at 246,454 as of 2017. Monroe Township, Middlesex County, in central New Jersey, the geographic heart of the Northeast megalopolis and ranked one of the ten safest cities in the United States, has displayed one of the fastest growth rates of its Indian population in the Western Hemisphere, increasing from 256 (0.9%) as of the 2000 Census to an estimated 5,943 (13.6%) as of 2017, representing a 2,221.5% (a multiple of 23) numerical increase over that period, including many affluent professionals and senior citizens, a temperate climate, as well as charitable benefactors to the COVID-19 relief efforts in India in official coordination with Monroe Township, as well as Bollywood actors with second homes. By 2022, the Indian population was approaching one-third of Monroe Township's population, and the nickname Edison-South had developed, in reference to the Little India stature of both Middlesex County, New Jersey townships. In 2014, 12,350 Indians legally immigrated to the New York-Northern New Jersey-Long Island, NY-NJ-PA core based statistical area; As of February 2022, Indian airline carrier Air India as well as United States airline carrier United Airlines were offering direct flights from the New York City Metropolitan Area to and from Delhi and Mumbai. In May 2019, Delta Air Lines announced non-stop flight service between New York JFK and Mumbai, to begin December 22, 2019. And in November 2021, American Airlines began non-stop flight dservice between New York JFK and Delhi with IndiGo Air codesharing on this flight. At least 24 Indian American enclaves characterized as a Little India have emerged in the New York City Metropolitan Area.

Other metropolitan areas with large Indian American populations include Atlanta, Austin, Baltimore–Washington, Boston, Chicago, Dallas–Ft. Worth, Detroit, Houston, Los Angeles, Philadelphia, Phoenix, Raleigh, San Francisco–San Jose–Oakland, and Seattle.

The three oldest Indian American communities going back to around 1910 are in lesser populated agricultural areas like Stockton, California south of Sacramento; the Central Valley of California like Yuba City; and Imperial County, California aka Imperial Valley. These were all primarily Sikh settlements.

U.S. metropolitan areas with large Asian Indian populations

While the table above provides a picture of the population of Indian Americans (alone) and Asian Americans (alone) in some of the metropolitan areas of the US, it is incomplete as it does not include multi-racial Asian Americans. Please note that data for multi-racial Asian Americans has not yet been released by the US Census Bureau.

List of U.S. states by the population of Asian Indians

List of communities by number of Asian Indians (as of the 2010 census):

 New York City: 192,209
Queens borough: 138,795
Brooklyn borough: 25,270
Manhattan borough: 24,359
Bronx borough: 16,748
Staten Island: 6,646
 San Jose, CA: 43,827
 Fremont, CA: 38,711
 Los Angeles, CA: 32,966
 Chicago, IL: 29,948
 Edison, NJ: 28,286
 Jersey City, NJ: 27,111
 Houston, TX: 26,289
 Sunnyvale, CA: 21,737
 Philadelphia, PA: 18,520
 Irving, TX: 17,403

Statistics

In 2006, of the 1,266,264 legal immigrants to the United States, 58,072 were from India. Between 2000 and 2006, 421,006 Indian immigrants were admitted to the U.S., up from 352,278 during the 1990–1999 period. According to the 2000 U.S. census, the overall growth rate for Indians from 1990 to 2000 was 105.87 percent. The average growth rate for the U.S. was 7.6 percent. Indians comprise 16.4 percent of the Asian-American community. In 2000, the Indian-born population in the U.S. was 1.007 million. According to the U.S. Census Bureau, between 1990 and 2000, the Indian population in the U.S. grew 130% – 10 times the national average of 13%. Indian Americans are the third largest Asian American ethnic group, following Chinese Americans and Filipino Americans.

A joint Duke University – UC Berkeley study revealed that Indian immigrants have founded more engineering and technology companies from 1995 to 2005 than immigrants from the UK, China, Taiwan and Japan combined. The percentage of Silicon Valley startups founded by Indian immigrants has increased from 7% in 1999 to 15.5% in 2006, as reported in the 1999 study by AnnaLee Saxenian and her updated work in 2006 in collaboration with Vivek Wadhawa. Indian Americans are making their way to the top positions of many major companies (including IBM, PepsiCo, MasterCard, Google, Facebook, Microsoft, Cisco, Oracle, Adobe, Softbank, Cognizant, Sun microsystems) A recent study shows that 23% of Indian business school graduates take a job in United States.

Socioeconomic status

Indian Americans continually outpace every other ethnic group socioeconomically per U.S. Census statistics. Thomas Friedman of The New York Times, in his 2005 book The World Is Flat, explains this trend in terms of brain drain, whereby a sample of the best and brightest people in India emigrate to the United States in order to seek better financial opportunities. Indians form the second largest group of physicians after non-Hispanic Caucasian Americans (3.9%) as of the 1990 survey, and the percentage of Indian physicians rose to around 6% in 2005.

Education
According to Pew Research in 2015, of Indian Americans aged 25 and older, 72% had obtained a bachelor's degree and 40% had obtained a postgraduate degree, whereas of all Americans, 19% had obtained a bachelor's degree and 11% had obtained a postgraduate degree.

Household income 
The median household income for Indian immigrants in 2019 was much higher than that of the overall foreign- and native-born populations. Indians overall have much higher incomes than the total foreign and native-born populations. In 2019, households headed by an Indian immigrant had a median income of $132,000, compared to $64,000 and $66,000 for all immigrant and U.S.-born households, respectively.

In 2019, Indian immigrants were less likely to be in poverty (5 percent) than immigrants overall (14 percent) or the U.S. born (12 percent).

Culture

Commerce
Patel Brothers is a supermarket chain serving the Indian diaspora, with 57 locations in 19 U.S. states—primarily located in the New Jersey/New York Metropolitan Area, due to its large Indian population, and with the East Windsor/Monroe Township, New Jersey location representing the world's largest and busiest Indian grocery store outside India. In DFW  there is another Indian Grocery chain India Bazar with 9 locations. Chicago, IL has 4 Patel Brothers including the first ever store.

Media

Gujarati, Telugu, Marathi, Punjabi, Malayalam, and Hindi radio stations are available in areas with high Indian populations, for example, Punjabi Radio USA, Easy96.com in the New York City metropolitan area, KLOK 1170 AM in San Francisco, RBC Radio; Radio Humsafar, Desi Junction in Chicago; Radio Salaam Namaste and FunAsia Radio in Dallas; and Masala Radio, FunAsia Radio, Sangeet Radio, Radio Naya Andaz in Houston and Washington Bangla Radio on Internet from the Washington DC Metro Area. There are also some radio stations broadcasting in Tamil within these communities. Houston-based Kannada Kaaranji radio focuses on a multitude of programs for children and adults.

AVS (Asian Variety Show) and Namaste America are South Asian programming available in most of the US that is free to air and can be watched with a television antenna.

Several cable and satellite television providers offer Indian channels: Sony TV, Zee TV, TV Asia, Star Plus, Sahara One, Colors, Sun TV, ETV, Big Magic, regional channels, and others have offered Indian content for subscription, such as the Cricket World Cup. There is also an American cricket channel called Willow.

Many metropolitan areas with large Indian American populations now have movie theaters which specialize in showing Indian movies, especially from Tollywood (Telugu), Kollywood (Tamil) and Bollywood (Hindi).

In July 2005, MTV premiered a spin-off network called MTV Desi which targets Indian Americans.  It has been discontinued by MTV.

In 2012, the film Not a Feather, but a Dot directed by Teju Prasad, was released which investigates the history, perceptions and changes in the Indian American community over the last century.

In popular media, several Indian American personalities have made their mark in recent years, including Kovid Gupta, Kal Penn, Hari Kondabolu, Karan Brar, Aziz Ansari, Hasan Minhaj, and Mindy Kaling.

Indian Independence Day Parade

The annual New York City India Day Parade, held on or approximately every August 15 since 1981, is the world's largest Indian Independence Day parade outside of India and is hosted by The Federation of Indian Associations (FIA). According to the website of Baruch College of the City University of New York, "The FIA, which came into being in 1970 is an umbrella organization meant to represent the diverse Indian population of NYC. Its mission is to promote and further the interests of its 500,000 members and to collaborate with other Indian cultural organization. The FIA acts as a mouth piece for the diverse Indian-Asian population in United States, and is focused on furthering the interests of this diverse community. The parade begins on East 38th Street and continues down Madison Avenue in Midtown Manhattan until it reaches 28th Street.  At the review stand on 28th Street, the grand marshal and various celebrities greet onlookers. Throughout the parade, participants find themselves surrounded by the saffron, white and green colors of the Indian flag. They can enjoy Indian food, merchandise booths, live dancing and music present at the Parade. After the parade is over, various cultural organizations and dance schools participate in program on 23rd Street and Madison Avenue until 6PM." The New York/New Jersey metropolitan region's second-largest India Independence Day parade takes place in Little India, Edison/Iselin in Middlesex County, New Jersey, annually in August.

Sikh Day Vaisakhi Parade
The world's largest Sikh Day Parade outside India celebrating Vaisakhi and the season of renewal is held in Manhattan annually in April. The parade is widely regarded as being one of the most colourful parades.

Religion

Communities of Hindus, Christians, Muslims, Sikhs, irreligious people, and smaller numbers of Jains, Buddhists, Zoroastrians, and Indian Jews have established their religions in the United States. According to 2014 Pew Research Center research, 51% consider themselves Hindu, 18% as Christian (Protestant 11%, Catholic 5%, other Christian 3%), 9% as unaffiliated, 10%
as Muslims, 5% as Sikh, and 2% as Jain.
The first religious center of an Indian religion to be established in the US was a Sikh Gurudwara in Stockton, California in 1912. Today there are many Sikh Gurudwaras, Hindu temples, Muslim mosques, Christian churches, and Buddhist and Jain temples in all 50 states.

Hindus

As of 2008, the American Hindu population was around 2.2 million. Hindus form the majority religious group amongst the Indian American community.  Many organizations such as ISKCON, Swaminarayan Sampraday, BAPS Swaminarayan Sanstha, Chinmaya Mission, and Swadhyay Pariwar are well-established in the U.S. and Hindu Americans have formed the Hindu American Foundation which represents American Hindus and aim to educate people about Hinduism. Swami Vivekananda brought Hinduism to the West at the 1893 Parliament of the World's Religions. The Vedanta Society has been important in subsequent Parliaments. In September 2021, the State of New Jersey aligned with the World Hindu Council to declare October as Hindu Heritage Month. Today, many Hindu temples, most of them built by Indian Americans, have emerged in different cities and towns in the United States. More than 18 million Americans are now practicing some form of Yoga. Kriya Yoga was introduced to America by Paramahansa Yogananda. A.C Bhaktivedanta Swami Prabhupada initiated the popular ISKCON, also known as the Hare Krishna movement, while preaching Bhakti yoga.

Sikhs

From the time of their arrival in the late 1800s, Sikh men and women have been making notable contributions to American society. In 2007, there were estimated to be between 250,000 and 500,000 Sikhs living in the United States, with largest populations living on the East and West Coasts, together with smaller additional populations in Detroit, Chicago, and Austin. The United States also has a number of non-Punjabi converts to Sikhism.
Sikh men are typically identifiable by their unshorn beards and turbans (head coverings), articles of their faith. Many organisations like World Sikh Organisation (WSO), Sikh Riders of America, SikhNet, Sikh Coalition, SALDEF, United Sikhs, National Sikh Campaign continue to educate people about Sikhism. There are many "Gurudwaras" Sikh temples present in all states of USA.

Jains

Adherents of  Jainism first arrived in the United States in the 20th century. The most significant time of Jain immigration was in the early 1970s. The US has since become the epicenter of the Jain diaspora. The Federation of Jain Associations in North America is an umbrella organization of local American and Canadian Jain congregations. Unlike India and United Kingdom, the Jain community in United States doesn't find sectarian differences—both Digambara and Śvētāmbara share a common roof.

Muslims

Hasan Minhaj, Fareed Zakaria, Aziz Ansari, and Pir Vilayat Inayat Khan are few well known Indian American Muslims.
Indian Muslim Americans also congregate with other American Muslims, including those from Pakistan, Bangladesh, Nepal, Sri Lanka, Bhutan, and Myanmar when there are events
particularly related to their faith and religious believes as the same can be applied for any other religious community, but there are prominent organizations such as the Indian Muslim Council – USA.

Christians

There are many Indian Christian churches across the US; India Pentecostal Church of God, Assemblies of God in India, Church of God (Full Gospel) in India, Church of South India, Church of North India, Christhava Tamil Koil, The Pentecostal Mission, Sharon Pentecostal Church, Independent Non Denominational Churches like Heavenly Feast, Plymouth Brethren. Saint Thomas Christians (Syro-Malabar Church, Syro-Malankara Catholic Church, Chaldean Syrian Church, Malankara Orthodox Syrian Church, Jacobite Syrian Christian Church, CSI Syrian Christians, Mar Thoma Syrian Church, Pentecostal Syrian Christians and St. Thomas Evangelical Church of India) from Kerala have established their own places of worship across the United States. The website USIndian.org has collected a comprehensive list of all the traditional St. Thomas Christian Churches in the US. There are also Catholic Indians hailing originally from Goa, Karnataka and Kerala, who attend the same services as other American Catholics, but may celebrate the feast of Saint Francis Xavier as a special event of their identity. The Indian Christian Americans have formed the Federation of Indian American Christian Organizations of North America (FIACONA) to represent a network of Indian Christian organizations in the US. FIACONA estimates the Indian American Christian population to be 1,050,000. The Syro-Malabar Church, an Eastern Catholic Church, native to India since the 1st century, established St. Thomas Syro-Malabar diocese of Chicago was established in the year 2001. St. Thomas day is celebrated in this church on July 3 every year.

Others
The large Parsi and Irani community is represented by the Federation of Zoroastrian Associations of North America. Indian Jews are perhaps the smallest organized religious group among Indian Americans, consisting of approximately 350 members in the US. They form the Indian Jewish Congregation of USA, with their headquarters in New York City.

Deepavali/Diwali, Eid/Ramadan as school holidays
Momentum has been growing to recognize the Dharmic holy day Deepavali (Diwali) as a holiday on school district calendars in the New York City metropolitan area. New York City announced in October 2022 that Diwali would be an official school holiday commencing in 2023.

Passaic, New Jersey established Diwali as a school holiday in 2005. South Brunswick, New Jersey in 2010 became the first of the many school districts with large Indian student populations in Middlesex County in New Jersey to add Diwali to the school calendar. Glen Rock, New Jersey in February 2015 became the first municipality in Bergen County, with its own burgeoning Indian population post-2010, to recognize Diwali as an annual school holiday, while thousands in Bergen County celebrated the first U.S. county-wide Diwali Mela festival under a unified sponsorship banner in 2016, while Fair Lawn in Bergen County celebrates Holi. Diwali/Deepavali is also recognized by Monroe Township, New Jersey.

Efforts have been undertaken in Millburn, Monroe Township, West Windsor-Plainsboro, Bernards Township, and North Brunswick, New Jersey, Long Island, as well as in New York City (ultimately successfully), among other school districts in the metropolitan region, to make Diwali a holiday on the school calendar. According to the Star-Ledger, Edison, New Jersey councilman Sudhanshu Prasad has noted parents' engagement in making Deepavali a holiday there; while in Jersey City, the four schools with major Asian Indian populations mark the holiday by inviting parents to the school buildings for festivities. Mahatma Gandhi Elementary School is located in Passaic, New Jersey. Efforts are also progressing toward making Diwali and Eid official holidays at all 24 school districts in Middlesex County. At least 12 school districts on Long Island closed for Diwali in 2022, and over 20 in New Jersey.

In March 2015, New York City Mayor Bill de Blasio officially declared the Muslim holy days Eid al-Fitr and Eid al-Adha holidays on the school calendar. School districts in Paterson and South Brunswick, New Jersey observe Ramadan.

Ethnicity

Like the terms "Asian American" or "South Asian American", the term "Indian American" is also an umbrella label applying to a variety of views, values, lifestyles, and appearances. Although Asian-Indian Americans retain a high ethnic identity, they are known to assimilate into American culture while at the same time keeping the culture of their ancestors.

Linguistic affiliation

The United States is home to various associations that promote Indian languages and cultures. Some major organizations include,
American Telugu Association (ATA)
Association of Kannada Kootas of America (AKKA)
Federation of Kerala Associations in North America (FOKANA)
Federation of Tamil Sangams of North America (FeTNA)
North America Vishwa Kannada Association (NAVIKA)
North American Bengali Conference (NABC)
Telugu Association of North America (TANA)
The Odisha Society of the Americas (OSA)
Maharashtra Mandal (MM)

Progress

Timeline

 1600: Beginning of the East India Company.
 1635: An "East Indian" is documented present in Jamestown, Virginia.
 1680: Due to anti-miscegenation laws, a mixed-race girl born to an Indian father and an Irish mother is classified as mulatto and sold into slavery.
 1790: The first officially confirmed Indian immigrant arrives in the United States from Madras, South India, on a British ship.
 1899–1914: The first significant wave of Indian immigrants arrives in the United States, mostly consisting of Sikh farmers and businessmen from the Punjab region of British India. They arrive in Angel Island, California via Hong Kong. They start businesses including farms and lumber mills in California, Oregon, and Washington.
 1909: Bhicaji Balsara becomes the first known Indian-born person to gain naturalised U.S. citizenship. As a Parsi, he was considered a "pure member of the Persian sect" and therefore a free White person. The judge Emile Henry Lacombe, of the Southern District of New York, only gave Balsara citizenship on the hope that the United States attorney would indeed challenge his decision and appeal it to create "an authoritative interpretation" of the law. The U.S. attorney adhered to Lacombe's wishes and took the matter to the Circuit Court of Appeals in 1910. The Circuit Court of Appeal agrees that Parsis are classified as white.
 1912: The first Sikh gurdwara opens in Stockton, California.
 1913: A. K. Mozumdar becomes the second Indian-born person to earn U.S. citizenship, having convinced the Spokane district judge that he was "Caucasian" and met the requirements of naturalization law that restricted citizenship to free White persons. In 1923, as a result of United States v. Bhagat Singh Thind, his citizenship was revoked.
 1914: Dhan Gopal Mukerji obtains a graduate degree from Stanford University, studying also at University of California, Berkeley and later goes on to win the Newbery Medal in 1928, and thus becomes the first successful India-born man of letters in the United States, as well as the first popular Indian writer in English.
 1917: The Barred Zone Act passes in Congress through two-thirds majority, overriding President Woodrow Wilson's earlier veto. Asians, including Indians, are barred from entering the United States.
 1918: Due to anti-miscegenation laws, there was significant controversy in Arizona when an Indian farmer B. K. Singh married the sixteen-year-old daughter of one of his White American tenants.
 1918: Private Raghunath N. Banawalkar is the first Indian American recruited into the U.S. Army on February 25, 1918, and serves in the Sanitary Detachment of the 305th Infantry Regiment, 77th Division, American Expeditionary Forces in France. Gassed while on active service in October 1918 and subsequently awarded Purple Heart medal.
 1918: Earliest record of LGBT Indian Americans—Jamil Singh in Sacramento, California
 1922: Yellapragada Subbarao, a Telugu from the state of Andhra Pradesh in Southern India arrived in Boston on October 26, 1922. He discovered the role of phosphocreatine and adenosine triphosphate (ATP) in muscular activity, which earned him an entry into biochemistry textbooks in the 1930s. He obtained his Ph.D. the same year, and went on to make other major discoveries; including the synthesis of aminopterin (later developed into methotrexate), the first cancer chemotherapy.
 1923: In United States v. Bhagat Singh Thind, the Supreme Court unanimously rules that Indian people are aliens ineligible for United States citizenship. Bhagat Singh Thind regained his citizenship years later in New York.
 1943: Republican Clare Boothe Luce and Democrat Emanuel Celler introduce a bill to open naturalization to Indian immigrants to the United States. Prominent Americans Pearl Buck, Louis Fischer, Albert Einstein and Robert Millikan give their endorsement to the bill. President Franklin D. Roosevelt, a Democrat, also endorses the bill, calling for an end to the "statutory discrimination against the Indians".
 1946: President Harry S. Truman signs into law the Luce–Celler Act of 1946, returning the right to Indian Americans to immigrate to the United States and become naturalized citizens.
 1956: Dalip Singh Saund elected to the U.S. House of Representatives from California. He was re-elected to a second and third term, winning over 60% of the vote. He is also the first Asian immigrant from any country to be elected to Congress.
 1962: Zubin Mehta appointed music director of the Los Angeles Philharmonic, becoming the first person of Indian origin to become the principal conductor of a major American orchestra. Subsequently, he was appointed principal conductor of the New York Philharmonic.
 1964: Amar G. Bose founded Bose Corporation. He was the chairman, primary stockholder, and Technical Director at Bose Corporation. He was former professor of electrical engineering at Massachusetts Institute of Technology.
 1965: President Lyndon Johnson signs the INS Act of 1965 into law, eliminating per-country immigration quotas and introducing immigration on the basis of professional experience and education. Satinder Mullick is one of the first to immigrate under the new law in November 1965—sponsored by Corning Glass Works.
 1968: Hargobind Khorana shared the Nobel Prize for Physiology or Medicine with Marshall W. Nirenberg and Robert W. Holley for discovering the mechanisms by which RNA codes for the synthesis of proteins. He was then on faculty at the University of Wisconsin, Madison, but later moved to MIT.
 1974: Mafat and Tulsi Patel open the first location of Patel Brothers on Devon Avenue in Chicago, one of the first Indian grocery chains in America
 1975: Launch of India-West, a leading newspaper covering issues of relevance to the Indian American community.
 1981: Suhas Patil founded Cirrus Logic, one of the first fabless semiconductor companies.
 1982: Vinod Khosla co-founded Sun Microsystems.
 1983: Subrahmanyam Chandrasekhar won the Nobel Prize for Physics; Asian Indian Women in America attended the first White House Briefing for Asian American Women. (AAIWA, formed in 1980, is the 1st Indian women's organization in North America.)
 1985: Balu Natarajan becomes the first Indian-American to win the Scripps National Spelling Bee
 1987: President Ronald Reagan appoints Joy Cherian, the first Indian Commissioner of the United States Equal Employment Opportunity Commission (EEOC).
 1988: Sanjay Mehrotra co-founded SanDisk.
 1989: Launch of RBC Radio, the first South Asian-Indian radio station in the United States.
 1990: Shiva Subramanya (an India-born Nuclear Physicist and Space Scientist working at TRW, Inc) became the first South Asian and first Indian American to win the Medal of Merit, the AFCEA's highest award for a civilian and one of the America's top defense award, in recognition of his exceptional service to AFCEA and the fields of Command, Control, Communications, Computers and Intelligence (C4I).
 1994: Rajat Gupta elected managing director of McKinsey & Company, the first Indian-born CEO of a multinational company.
 1994: Guitarist Kim Thayil, of Indian origin, wins Grammy award for his Indian inspired guitarwork on the album Superunknown by his band Soundgarden.
 1994: Raj Reddy received the ACM Turing Award (with Edward Feigenbaum) "For pioneering the design and construction of large scale artificial intelligence systems, demonstrating the practical importance and potential commercial impact of artificial intelligence technology".
 1996: Pradeep Sindhu founded Juniper Networks
 1996: Rajat Gupta and Anil Kumar of McKinsey & Company co-found the Indian School of Business.
 1997: Kalpana Chawla, one of the six-member crew of STS-87 mission, becomes the first Indian American astronaut.
 1999: NASA names the third of its four "Great Observatories" Chandra X-ray Observatory after Subrahmanyan Chandrasekhar the Indian-born American astrophysicist and a Nobel laureate.
 1999: Filmmaker M. Night Shyamalan enters film history with his film The Sixth Sense becoming one of the all-time highest-grossing films worldwide.
 1999: Rono Dutta becomes the president of United Airlines.
 2001: Professor Dipak C. Jain (born in Tezpur – Assam, India) appointed as dean of the Kellogg School of Management, Northwestern University.
 2002: Professor of statistics Calyampudi Radhakrishna Rao is awarded National Medal of Science by President George W. Bush.
 2005: Abhi Talwalkar becomes president and chief executive officer of LSI Corporation

 2006: Indra Nooyi (born in Chennai, India) appointed as CEO of PepsiCo.
 2007: Bobby Jindal is elected governor of Louisiana and is the first person of Indian descent to be elected governor of an American state.
 2007: Renu Khator appointed to a dual-role as chancellor of the University of Houston System and president of the University of Houston.
 2007: Francisco D'Souza appointed as the president and CEO and of Cognizant Technology Solutions. He is one of the youngest chief executive officers in the software services sector at the age 38 in the United States.
 2007: Vikram Pandit (born in Nagpur, Maharashtra, India) appointed as CEO of Citigroup. He was previously the president and CEO of the Institutional Securities and Investment Banking Group at Morgan Stanley.
 2007: Shantanu Narayen appointed as CEO of Adobe Systems.
 2008: Treasury Secretary Henry Paulson appoints Neel Kashkari as the Interim U.S. Assistant Secretary of the Treasury for Financial Stability.
 2008: Raj Chetty appointed as professor of economics at Harvard University the age of 29, one of the youngest ever to receive tenure of professorship in the Department of Economics at Harvard.
 2008: Sanjay Jha appointed as Co-CEO of Motorola, Inc..
 2008: Establishment of the South Asian American Digital Archive (SAADA) to document the history of the South Asian American community.

 2009: President Barack Obama appoints Preet Bharara (born in Firozpur, India; graduate of Harvard College Class of 1990 and Columbia Law School Class of 1993) as United States attorney for the Southern District of New York Manhattan.
 Farah Pandith appointed as Special Representative to Muslim Communities for the United States Department of State.
 2009: President Barack Obama appoints Aneesh Paul Chopra as the first American Federal Chief Technology Officer of the United States (CTO).
 2009: President Barack Obama appoints Eboo Patel and Anju Bhargava on President's Advisory Council on Faith Based and Neighborhood Partnerships.
 2009: President Barack Obama appoints Vinai Thummalapally as the U.S. Ambassador to Belize
 2009: President Barack Obama nominates Rajiv Shah, M.D. as the new head of United States Agency for International Development.
 2009: President Barack Obama nominates Islam A. Siddiqui as the Chief Agricultural Negotiator in the Office of the U.S. Trade Representative.
 2010: President of Harvard University Catherine Drew Gilpin Faust appoints Nitin Nohria as the tenth dean of Harvard Business School.
 2010: President of University of Chicago Robert Zimmer appoints Sunil Kumar as the dean of University of Chicago Booth School of Business.
 2010: Deven Sharma appointed president of Standard & Poor's.
 2010: Ajaypal Banga appointed president and CEO of MasterCard.
 2010: President Barack Obama nominates Subra Suresh, Dean of Engineering at MIT as director of National Science Foundation.
 2010: Year marks the most candidates of Indian origin, running for political offices in the United States, including candidates such as Ami Bera.
 2010: State Representative Nikki Haley is elected Governor of South Carolina and becomes the first Indian American woman and second Indian American in general to become Governor of an American state.
 2011: Jamshed Bharucha named president of Cooper Union. Previous to that, he was appointed dean of the Faculty of Arts & Sciences at Dartmouth College in 2001, the first Indian American dean at an Ivy League institution, and Provost at Tufts University in 2002.
 2011: Satish K. Tripathi appointed as President of University at Buffalo, The State University of New York.
 2011: Rohit Gupta wins over 100 international awards & accolades for his films Life! Camera Action... and Another Day Another Life.
 2011: Bobby Jindal is re-elected Governor of Louisiana.
 2012: Ami Bera is elected to the House of Representatives from California.
 2013: Vistap Karbhari appointed as president of University of Texas at Arlington
 2013: Sri Srinivasan is confirmed as a Judge of the United States Court of Appeals for the District of Columbia Circuit.
 2013: Nina Davuluri wins Miss America 2014.
 2013: Arun M Kumar appointed as assistant secretary and director general of the U.S. and Foreign Commercial Service, International Trade Administration in the Department of Commerce.
 2014: Satya Nadella appointed as CEO of Microsoft.

 2014: Vivek Murthy appointed as the nineteenth Surgeon General of the United States.  He returned to the role again in 2021 to serve as the twenty-first Surgeon General. 
 2014: Rakesh Khurana appointed as the dean of Harvard College, the original founding college of Harvard University.
 2014: Manjul Bhargava wins Fields Medal in Mathematics.
 2015: Sundar Pichai appointed as the chairman and CEO of Google.
 2016: Pramila Jayapal, Ro Khanna, and Raja Krishnamoorthi are elected to the U.S. House of Representatives. This puts the total number of people of Indian and South Asian origin in Congress at 5, the largest in history.
 2016: President Donald Trump nominates Seema Verma to lead the Centers for Medicare and Medicaid Services. Her nomination is confirmed in 2017.
 2017: Hasan Minhaj roasts President Donald Trump at the White House Correspondents' Association Dinner, becoming the first Indian American and Muslim-American to perform at the event. 
 2017: President Donald Trump nominates Ajit Pai as chairman of the Federal Communications Commission (FCC).
 2017: Balvir Singh was elected to the Burlington County Board of Chosen Freeholders, New Jersey on November 7, 2017. He became the first Asian-American to win a countywide election in Burlington County and the first Sikh-American to win a countywide election in New Jersey.
 2019: Seven out of the eight winners of the Scripps National Spelling Bee (Saketh Sundar, Abhijay Kodali, Shruthika Padhy, Sohum Sukhatankar, Christopher Serrao, Rohan Raja, and Rishik Gandhasri), are Indian Americans. They have broken the spelling bee according to several experts and have dominated this American institution.
 2019: Lilly Singh became the first person of Indian descent to host an American major broadcast network late-night talk show A Little Late with Lilly Singh.
 2019: Abhijit Banerjee is awarded the Nobel Memorial Prize in Economic Sciences.
 2020: Kash Patel is named chief of staff to the Acting Defense Secretary Chris Miller.
 2020: Arvind Krishna appointed as the CEO of IBM. 
 2021: Kamala Harris, born to an Indian mother, became the first woman and first Indian origin Vice President of the United States. 
 2021: Anirudh Devgan appointed as the CEO and President of Cadence Design Systems.
 2021: Parag Agrawal appointed as the CEO of Twitter.
 2022: Laxman Narasimhan appointed CEO of Starbucks.
 2022: Shruti Miyashiro appointed as the President and CEO of Digital Federal Credit Union (DCU).
 2022: Aruna Miller elected the first Asian American lieutenant governor of Maryland and first South Asian woman elected lieutenant governor in the U.S.
 2023: Neal Mohan was appointed as the fourth CEO of Youtube.

Classification

According to the official U.S. racial categories employed by the United States Census Bureau, Office of Management and Budget and other U.S. government agencies, American citizens or resident aliens who marked "Asian Indian" as their ancestry or wrote in a term that was automatically classified as an Asian Indian became classified as part of the Asian race at the 2000 US Census. As with other modern official U.S. government racial categories, the term "Asian" is in itself a broad and heterogeneous classification, encompassing all peoples with origins in the original peoples of the Far East, Southeast Asia, and the Indian subcontinent.

In previous decades, Indian Americans were also variously classified as White American, the "Hindu race", and "other". Even today, where individual Indian Americans do not racially self-identify, and instead report Muslim, Jewish, and Zoroastrian as their "race" in the "some other race" section without noting their country of origin, they are automatically tallied as white. This may result in the counting of persons such as Indian Muslims, Indian Jews, and Indian Zoroastrians as white, if they solely report their religious heritage without their national origin.

Current issues

Discrimination

In the 1980s, a gang known as the Dotbusters specifically targeted Indian Americans in Jersey City, New Jersey with violence and harassment. Studies of racial discrimination, as well as stereotyping and scapegoating of Indian Americans have been conducted in recent years. In particular, racial discrimination against Indian Americans in the workplace has been correlated with Indophobia due to the rise in outsourcing/offshoring, whereby Indian Americans are blamed for US companies offshoring white-collar labor to India.  According to the offices of the Congressional Caucus on India, many Indian Americans are severely concerned of a backlash, though nothing serious has taken place. Due to various socio-cultural reasons, implicit racial discrimination against Indian Americans largely go unreported by the Indian American community.

Numerous cases of religious stereotyping of American Hindus (mainly of Indian origin) have also been documented.

Since the September 11, 2001 attacks, there have been scattered incidents of Indian Americans becoming mistaken targets for hate crimes. In one example, a Sikh, Balbir Singh Sodhi, was murdered at a Phoenix gas station by a white supremacist. This happened after September 11, and the murderer claimed that his turban made him think that the victim was a Middle Eastern American. In another example, a pizza deliverer was mugged and beaten in Massachusetts for "being Muslim" though the victim pleaded with the assailants that he was in fact a Hindu. In December 2012, an Indian American in New York City was pushed from behind onto the tracks at the 40th Street-Lowery Street station in Sunnyside and killed. The police arrested a woman, Erika Menendez, who admitted to the act and justified it, stating that she shoved him onto the tracks because she believed he was "a Hindu or a Muslim" and she wanted to retaliate for the attacks of September 11, 2001.

In 2004, New York Senator Hillary Clinton joked at a fundraising event with South Asians for Nancy Farmer that Mahatma Gandhi owned a gas station in downtown St. Louis, fueling the stereotype that gas stations are owned by Indians and other South Asians. She clarified in the speech later that she was just joking, but still received some criticism for the statement later on for which she apologized again.

On April 5, 2006, the Hindu Mandir of Minnesota was vandalized allegedly on the basis of religious discrimination. The vandals damaged temple property leading to $200,000 worth of damage.

On August 11, 2006, Senator George Allen allegedly referred to an opponent's political staffer of Indian ancestry as  "macaca" and commenting, "Welcome to America, to the real world of Virginia". Some members of the Indian American community saw Allen's comments, and the backlash that may have contributed to Allen losing his re-election bid, as demonstrative of the power of YouTube in the 21st century.

In 2006, then Delaware Senator and current U.S President Joe Biden was caught on microphone saying: "In Delaware, the largest growth in population is Indian Americans moving from India. You cannot go to a 7-Eleven or a Dunkin' Donuts unless you have a slight Indian accent. I'm not joking."

On August 5, 2012, white supremacist Wade Michael Page shot eight people and killed six at a Sikh gurdwara in Oak Creek, Wisconsin.

On February 22, 2017, recent immigrants Srinivas Kuchibhotla and Alok Madasani were shot at a bar in Olathe, Kansas by Adam Purinton, a white American who mistook them for persons of Middle Eastern descent, yelling "get out of my country" and "terrorist". Kuchibhotla died instantly while Madasani was injured, but later recovered.

Punjabi Sikh Americans in Indianapolis suffered many losses in their community on April 15, 2021, during the Indianapolis FedEx shooting in which gunman Brandon Scott Hole, with a currently unknown motive, entered a FedEx warehouse and killed eight people, half of whom were Sikh. The Sikh victims were Jaswinder Singh, Jasvinder Kaur, Amarjit Sekhon, and Amarjeet Johal. Ninety percent of the workers at the facility were Sikh according to some accounts. Another Sikh, Taptejdeep Singh, was one of the nine people killed in the San Jose shooting on May 26.

Immigration
Indians are among the largest ethnic groups legally immigrating to the United States. The immigration of Indians has taken place in several waves since the first Indian came to the United States in the 1700s. A major wave of immigration to California from the region of Punjab took place in the first decade of the 20th century. Another significant wave followed in the 1950s which mainly included students and professionals. The elimination of immigration quotas in 1965 spurred successively larger waves of immigrants in the late 1970s and early 1980s. With the technology boom of the 1990s, the largest influx of Indians arrived between 1995 and 2000. This latter group has also caused surge in the application for various immigration benefits including applications for green card. This has resulted in long waiting periods for people born in India from receiving these benefits.

As of 2012, over 330,000 Indians were on the visa wait list, third only to Mexico and The Philippines.

In December, 2015, over 30 Indian students seeking admission in two US universities—Silicon Valley University and the Northwestern Polytechnic University—were denied entry by Customs and Border Protection and were deported to India. Conflicting reports suggested that the students were deported because of the controversies surrounding the above-mentioned two universities. However, another report suggested that the students were deported as they had provided conflicting information at the time of their arrival in US to what was mentioned in their visa application. "According to the US Government, the deported persons had presented information to the border patrol agent which was inconsistent with their visa status," read an advisory published by Ministry of External Affairs (India) which was published in the Hindustan Times.

Following the incident, the Indian government asked the US government to honour the visas given by its embassies and consulates. In response, the United States embassy advised the students considering studying in the US to seek assistance from Education USA.

Citizenship
Unlike many countries, India does not allow dual citizenship. Consequently, many Indian citizens residing in U.S., who do not want to lose their Indian nationality, do not apply for American citizenship (ex. Raghuram Rajan). However, many Indian Americans obtain Overseas Citizenship of India (OCI) status, which allows them to live and work in India indefinitely.

Income disparities 
Although Indian Americans have the highest average and median household income of any demographic group in America, there exist significant and severe income disparities among various communities of Indian Americans. In Long Island, the average family income of Indian Americans was roughly $273,000, while in Fresno, the average family income of Indian Americans was only $24,000, an eleven-fold difference.

Illegal immigration

In 2009, the Department of Homeland Security estimated that there were 200,000 Indian unauthorized immigrants; they are the sixth largest nationality (tied with Koreans) of illegal immigrants behind Mexico, El Salvador, Guatemala, Honduras, and the Philippines. Indian Americans have had an increase in illegal immigration of 25% since 2000. In 2014, Pew Research Center estimated that there are 450,000 undocumented Indians in the United States.

Media

Politics
Several groups have tried to create a voice for Indian Americans in political affairs, including the United States India Political Action Committee and the Indian American Leadership Initiative, as well as panethnic groups such as South Asian Americans Leading Together and Desis Rising Up and Moving. Additionally, there are industry groups such as the Asian American Hotel Owners Association and the Association of American Physicians of Indian Origin.

A majority tend to identify as moderates and have voted for Democrats in recent elections, in particular supporting Barack Obama in vast numbers. Polls before the 2004 presidential election showed Indian Americans favoring Democratic candidate John Kerry over Republican George W. Bush by a 53% to 14% margin, with 30% undecided at the time. The Republican party has tried to target this community for political support, and in 2007, Republican Congressman Bobby Jindal became the first United States Governor of Indian descent when he was elected Governor of Louisiana. Nikki Haley, also of Indian descent and a fellow Republican, became Governor of South Carolina in 2010. Republican Neel Kashkari is also of Indian descent and ran for Governor of California in 2014. Raja Krishnamoorthi who is a lawyer, engineer and community leader from Schaumburg, Illinois has been the Congressman representing Illinois's 8th congressional district since 2017. Jenifer Rajkumar is a Lower Manhattan district leader and the first Indian American woman elected to the state legislature in New York history. In 2016, Kamala Harris (the daughter of a Tamil Indian American mother, Dr. Shyamala Gopalan Harris, and an Afro-Jamaican American father, Donald Harris) became the first Indian American and second African American female to serve in the United States Senate. In 2020, she briefly ran for President of the United States and was later chosen as the Democratic Party's vice-presidential nominee, running alongside Joe Biden. Indian Americans have played a significant role in promoting better India–United States relations, turning the cold attitude of American legislators to a positive perception of India in the post-Cold War era.

Notable people

See also

 Indians in the New York City metropolitan area
 India–United States relations
 Indian Canadians
 Indo-Caribbean Americans
 Indian diaspora
 Racial classification of Indian Americans 
 Romani Americans
 Romani diaspora

References

Further reading

 Atkinson, David C. The burden of white supremacy: Containing Asian migration in the British empire and the United States (U North Carolina Press, 2016).
 Bacon, Jean. Life Lines: Community, Family, and Assimilation among Asian Indian Immigrants (Oxford UP, 1996).
 Bhalla, Vibha. "'Couch potatoes and super-women' Gender, migration, and the emerging discourse on housework among Asian Indian immigrants." Journal of American Ethnic History 27.4 (2008): 71–99. online 
 
 Joshi, Khyati Y. New Roots in America's Sacred Ground: Religion, Race and Ethnicity in Indian America (Rutgers UP, 2006).
 Khandelwal, Madhulika S. Becoming American, Being Indian: An Immigrant Community in New York City (Cornell UP, 2002).
 Maira, Sunaina Marr. Desis in the House: Indian American Youth Culture in NYC (Temple UP,  2002).
 Min, Pyong Gap, and Young Oak Kim. "Ethnic and sub-ethnic attachments among Chinese, Korean, and Indian immigrants in New York City." Ethnic and Racial Studies 32.5 (2009): 758–780.
 Pavri, Tinaz. "Asian Indian Americans." Gale Encyclopedia of Multicultural America, edited by Thomas Riggs, (3rd ed., vol. 1, Gale, 2014), pp. 165–178. online 
 
 Rudrappa, Sharmila. Ethnic Routes to Becoming American: Indian Immigrants and the Cultures of Citizenship (Rutgers UP, 2004).
 Schlund-Vials, Cathy J., Linda Trinh Võ, and K. Scott Wong, eds. Keywords for Asian American Studies (NYU Press, 2015).
 Shukla, Sandhya. India Abroad: Diasporic Cultures of Postwar America and England (Princeton UP, 2003).
 Sohi, Seema. Echoes of Mutiny: Race, Surveillance, and Indian Anticolonialism in North America (2014) excerpt 
 
 Thernstrom, Stephan; Orlov, Ann; Handlin, Oscar, eds. Harvard Encyclopedia of American Ethnic Groups, Harvard University Press, (1980), pp 296–301. available to borrow online

External links
  The American Institute of India Studies (AIIS)
 Madhusudan and Kiran C. Dhar India Studies Program at Indiana University Bloomington
 From 1917 to 2017: Immigration, Exclusion, and "National Security" by Seema Sohi
 Widely exhibited across museums in the US, historic photography project of Indians living in the late 1980s in America

Asian-American society
American
South Asian American